Kamran Hotak (born 7 January 2003) is an Afghan cricketer. He made his first-class debut for Band-e-Amir Region in the final of the 2018 Ahmad Shah Abdali 4-day Tournament on 8 May 2018.

References

External links
 

2003 births
Living people
Afghan cricketers
Band-e-Amir Dragons cricketers
Place of birth missing (living people)
21st-century Afghan people